Pertti Torikka (born 11 September 1954) is a Swedish weightlifter. He competed in the men's bantamweight event at the 1980 Summer Olympics. Born in Kolari, Finland, Torikka moved to Sweden in 1971 and received Swedish citizenship in 1974.

References

1954 births
Living people
Swedish male weightlifters
Olympic weightlifters of Sweden
Weightlifters at the 1980 Summer Olympics
People from Kolari
Finnish emigrants to Sweden
Naturalized citizens of Sweden